Mamadou Kaly Sène (born 28 May 2001) is a Senegalese footballer who plays as a forward for Swiss club Basel.

Club career
Sène started his youth football with local club USD Vanchiglia 2014 in Turin. In the summer of 2018, he was signed by Juventus to play for their Primavera Squad, in the highest level of Italian youth football. He was with them for two seasons, playing 31 games and scoring 10 goals. He also represented the club in the UEFA Youth League.

On 21 August 2020 Basel announced that they had signed Sène and at the same time they also stated that, so as the 19-year-old could get match practice at the highest level, as quickly as possible, the club loaned him out to Omonia in Nicosia for a year until the summer of 2021. Because he had played 16 competitive games across all competitions by the winter break, his person met all the requirements for a Swiss work permit. Therefore, he returned to Switzerland and was able to train and play games with the Basel first team and with immediate effect.

Sène played his domestic league debut for his new club in the away game in the Letzigrund on 14 February 2021. He was substituted in the 72nd minute as Basel were defeated 0–2 by Zürich. In his first season with his new club Sène played a total of six games (five in the league, 1 test match) for Basel without scoring a goal.

On 1 September 2021, he joined Grasshoppers on a year-long loan with an option to buy. In his second game for Grasshoppers on 26 September 2021, he scored twice in a 3–1 win over FC Sion, and a week later he again scored twice against St. Gallen. St. Gallen would prove his favorite opponent, as he scored a hattrick against them on 5 December 2021 in their second matchup of the season. In particular, his second goal in that game, a stunning overhead kick, was voted by Grasshopper fans as the goal of the season. Grasshopper chose not to take the buy option and Sène returned to Basel at the end of the season.

Following his return to Basel, he was went to trial at Anderlecht, who would be paying a reported € 2.5 million. Later on, reports linked him with fellow Belgian First Division A side OHL.

Career statistics

References

Sources
 
 Profile Kaly Sene at homepage of Verein "Basler Fussballarchiv”
 Καλί Σενέ

2001 births
Footballers from Dakar
Living people
Senegalese footballers
Association football forwards
AC Omonia players
FC Basel players
Grasshopper Club Zürich players
Cypriot First Division players
Swiss Super League players
Senegalese expatriate footballers
Expatriate footballers in Italy
Senegalese expatriate sportspeople in Italy
Expatriate footballers in Cyprus
Senegalese expatriate sportspeople in Cyprus
Expatriate footballers in Switzerland
Senegalese expatriate sportspeople in Switzerland